Jorge Villalpando Romo (born 13 March 1985) is a Mexican former professional footballer who played as a goalkeeper.

Club career

Puebla
Although he has been in the first team since 2005, he made his professional debut in the Primera División (First Division) until the Apertura 2007 tournament on October 21 against Toluca. It was Puebla's first tournament after returning to the First Division when relegated to the Liga de Ascenso during the Clausura 2005 tournament. The game resulted in a 0–2 loss for Puebla.

Loan Spells
Villalpando has been out on loan to multiple Liga MX clubs from his parent club, Morelia. In 2017 Jorge Villalpando was signed by Lobos BUAP recently promoted to la Liga MX from the ascenso mx he became regular starter then was demoted from 1st choice keeper to the bench Jose Antonio Rodriguez loaned from chivas de Guadalajara toke over the starting posición

International career
Villalpando was chosen by Hugo Sánchez to play for the Mexico national team but he did not see any action.

External links
 Jorge Villalpando's Statistics

1985 births
Club Puebla players
Atlético Morelia players
Liga MX players
Living people
Mexican people of Spanish descent
Footballers from Mexico City
Mexican footballers
Association football goalkeepers
Chiapas F.C. footballers
Deportivo Toluca F.C. players
Atlas F.C. footballers
Atlante F.C. footballers